Donalda is a village in central Alberta, Canada that is east of Ponoka. It was founded in 1911 and takes its name from Donalda Crossway, a niece of Sir Donald Mann, a Canadian Northern Railway official. The village was first named Eidswold by the Norwegian settlers who first founded the community. It was renamed Donalda in 1910, when the railroad came through.

Demographics 

In the 2016 Census of Population conducted by Statistics Canada, the Village of Donalda recorded a population of 219 living in 115 of its 131 total private dwellings, a  change from its 2011 population of 259.

Education 
Donalda School has about 80 students from pre-kindergarten to grade 9.

Notable people 
Cody Cassidy, steer wrestler
Robert E. Collin, distinguished electrical engineering professor
Tricia Helfer, Actress/model, best known for playing Number Six in the re-imagined Battlestar Galactica miniseries and television series, is from Donalda.

See also 
List of communities in Alberta
List of villages in Alberta

References

External links 

1912 establishments in Alberta
Villages in Alberta